Farman Haider is an television actor born and raised in Moradabad, India. He is known for the show Saavi Ki Savaari as Nityam Dalmiya.

Early life 
Haider started his career with show Rakshabandhan... Rasal Apne Bhai Ki Dhal.

Education 
He had studied Bachelor of Legislative Law.

Television

References

External links 

 

Living people
1994 births
People from Moradabad